Irish Mountain is a mountain located in the Catskill Mountains of New York southwest of Grand Gorge. Irish Mountain is located southeast of Moresville Range and north of Schultice Mountain.

References

Mountains of Delaware County, New York
Mountains of New York (state)